Palo Verde High School is a high school in Las Vegas, Nevada, United States.
The school was built in 1996 with an adjacent 10 portable classrooms located in Summerlin, a rapidly growing suburban community in the western portion of the City of Las Vegas and unincorporated Clark County. The origin of the school's name comes from the surrounding palo verde trees. The school's ethnic ratio is 59.4% Caucasian; 17.1% Hispanic; 11.5% Asian/Pacific Islander; 11.4% African American and 0.6% Native American.

The school site includes a College of Southern Nevada (CSN) High Tech Center and an adjacent Parks and Recreation facility.

Athletics

Fall Sports
Cross Country
Football
Women's Volleyball
Men's Soccer
Women's Golf
Tennis
Women's Soccer

Winter Sports
Basketball
Wrestling
Women's Flag Football
Bowling

Spring Sports
Track
Baseball
Softball
Men's Golf
Men's Lacrosse
Women's Lacrosse
Boys’ Volleyball
Swimming and Diving

Notable alumni
Elle McLemore - Broadway Actress
Arianny Celeste – Model and UFC Octagon Girl 
Saalim Hakim – American football player 
Cassie Jaye – Actress and filmmaker
Brandon Kintzler – Major League Baseball pitcher for the Chicago Cubs 
Gerard Lawson – Retired NFL player, formerly with the Philadelphia Eagles 
Cody Miller – Team USA Olympic swimmer
Erica Sullivan – Team USA Olympic swimmer
Matt Polster – Footballer, Victoria Highlanders, Chicago Fire, Rangers F.C., United States U23, United States
Brittany Martin Porter – television producer
Ryan Reeves – WWE professional wrestler, known as Ryback 
Brendon Urie – Lead singer of Panic! at the Disco
Jessie Vargas – Professional boxer
 Brent Wilson (musician) - Former bassist of Panic! at the Disco
 Justin Burger (Socialite) - Paris Hilton's Cousin and Kyle Richards Nephew

References

External links

Palo Verde High School
Clark County School District

Clark County School District
Educational institutions established in 1996
High schools in Las Vegas
School buildings completed in 1996
Public high schools in Nevada
1996 establishments in Nevada